Eclectric is the first solo album by Svoy. It was originally released independently on December 13, 2005 on Svoy's Sixteenth Republic Records and later licensed, remastered, re-packaged and re-released May 1, 2007 by Rendezvous Entertainment/Universal Music Group to generally positive critical reviews. After Rendezvous' acquisition by Mack Avenue Records in August 2008, the album became part of the Mack Avenue/Sony Music Entertainment catalogue. As an import, the record gained substantial popularity in Japan and on July 8, 2009, was released by Tokyo-based Thistime Records as a 2-CD set featuring two bonus tracks on the first CD and Svoy's Consequence EP 1.0 on the second. Japan edition also featured new booklet with revised extended artwork and a separate slip with biography and lyrics translated into Japanese. In 2012, the master license to both Rendezvous/Mack Avenue and Thistime Records expired with the sound recording rights to the album reverting to Svoy. After a brief confrontation with the labels to cease distributing the album, Svoy remastered and re-released Eclectric internationally in the fall of the same year.

Track listing

Personnel 
Svoy – keyboards, vocals, producer, programming, vocal arrangement, sound engineering, mixing, mastering (track 13, 14; 2012 remastered version), artwork revision (Japan edition; 2012 version)
Myles D'Marco – guitar (track 7)
A-ux – co-production (track 8)
Steve Fallone – mastering
Daichi Miyata – co-production (track 13)
Shoshannah White – photography
Kevin Reagan – art direction, design, photography, collages
Lauren Taylor – design, collages, photography
Dave Koz – executive producer
Frank Cody – executive producer
Hyman Katz – executive producer
Jeff Chiang – product manager

Release history

References 

2007 debut albums
Svoy albums